Renate Hoy, also credited as Renate Huy and Erika Nordin,(born 31 December 1930 in Ludwigshafen, Mannheim, Germany) is a German actress.

Career
After winning the title of Miss Nürnberg, she was crowned Miss Germany of 1952. She then travelled to the United States to represent her country in the first Miss Universe contest, which was held in Long Beach, California where she placed fifth (fourth runner up).

Shortly thereafter, she became a contract player for Universal Studios and made several movies during the 1950s. She was in such films as Abbott and Costello Go to Mars, Missile to the Moon, The Golden Blade, The Birds and the Bees, The Sea Chase, A Certain Smile, and had a leading role in the classic German film Schloß Hubertus.

Personal life
In 1954, she married actor Brett Halsey. They had two children, son Charles Oliver Hand, Jr. (a.k.a. "Rock Bottom" of the Los Angeles-based punk band Rock Bottom and the Spys) and daughter Tracy Leigh. They divorced in 1959. Charles Hand was murdered in prison while serving a 25-year sentence.

Following a landmark 1960 Screen Actors Guild strike, Hoy retired from acting. In 1963, Hoy married prominent civil rights attorney Raymond C. Simpson. The couple had one child, musician Richard James Simpson, a member of the bands Invisiblechains and Teardrain. Renate currently resides in Southern California.

References

External links
 

1930 births
20th-century German actresses
German beauty pageant winners
German film actresses
Living people
Miss Universe 1952 contestants
People from Ludwigshafen